The 2010 Morocco Tennis Tour – Rabat was a professional tennis tournament played on outdoor red clay courts. It was part of the 2010 ATP Challenger Tour. It took place in Rabat, Morocco between 9 and 15 March 2010.

ATP entrants

Seeds

Rankings are as of March 1, 2010.

Other entrants
The following players received wildcards into the singles main draw:
  Rabie Chaki
  Reda El Amrani
  Hicham Khaddari
  Mehdi Ziadi

The following players received entry from the qualifying draw:
  Andrea Arnaboldi
  Bastian Knittel
  Adrián Menéndez Maceiras
  João Sousa

Champions

Singles

 Rubén Ramírez Hidalgo def.  Marcel Granollers, 6–4, 6–4

Doubles

 Ilija Bozoljac /  Daniele Bracciali def.  Oleksandr Dolgopolov Jr. /  Dmitri Sitak, 6–4, 6–4

External links
Morocco Tennis Tour official website

Morocco Tennis Tour - Rabat
2010 Morocco Tennis Tour
Morocco Tennis Tour – Rabat
21st century in Rabat